Calothamnus pinifolius, commonly known as dense clawflower, is a plant in the myrtle family, Myrtaceae and is endemic to the south-west of Western Australia. It is an erect shrub with dense foliage and clusters of red flowers, partly immersed in the prickly foliage, between July and January.

Description

Flowering occurs between July and January. Flowering is followed by fruits which are woody capsules which have two prominent, curved lobes.<ref name=FloraBase>{{FloraBase|name = Calothamnus pinifolius’'|id = 5423}}</ref>

Taxonomy and namingCalothamnus pinifolius was first formally described in 1863 by Victorian Government botanist Ferdinand von Mueller in the third volume of Fragmenta Phytographiae Australiae. (In 2014 Lyndley Craven, Edwards and Cowley proposed that the species be renamed Melaleuca peucophylla.) The specific epithet (pinifolius) is from the Latin words pinus meaning "pine" and folium meaning "leaf".

Distribution and habitatCalothamnus pinifolius'' occurs in the Mount Barren Range in the Esperance Plains biogeographic region. It grows on slopes in dense scrub in rocky soils derived from laterite and quartzite.

References

pinifolius
Myrtales of Australia
Rosids of Western Australia
Plants described in 1863
Endemic flora of Western Australia
Taxa named by Ferdinand von Mueller